David F. Grey is an American professional poker player from Henderson, Nevada.

Grey is best known as a cash-game player, but he also has several notable poker tournament wins to his name.

He has won two bracelets at the World Series of Poker, the first in 1999 and the second in 2005.  In addition, Grey made the final table of the 2003 $10,000 No Limit Texas hold 'em Main Event, where he finished eighth, receiving $160,000. Eventual winner Chris Moneymaker eliminated Grey.

Grey appeared in the second seasons of both the Poker Superstars Invitational Tournament and High Stakes Poker, and came second to Daniel Negreanu on Poker After Dark.

As of 2009, his total live tournament winnings exceed $1,500,000. His 15 cashes at the WSOP account for $913,691 of those winnings.

World Series of Poker bracelets

Notes

External links
Official Site
Onlinepokercenter.com interview

People from Henderson, Nevada
American poker players
Living people
World Series of Poker bracelet winners
Year of birth missing (living people)